Basketball events were contested at the 1985 Summer Universiade in Kobe, Japan.

References
 Universiade basketball medalists on HickokSports

Universaiie
1985 Summer Universiade
1985
Universiade